Rajiva Wijesinha, MA, DPhil (Sinhala: රජීව විජේසිංහ) (born 16 May 1954) is a Sri Lankan writer in English, distinguished for his political analysis as well as creative and critical work. An academic by profession for much of his working career, he was most recently Senior Professor of Languages at the University of Sabaragamuwa, Sri Lanka.

In June 2007 President Mahinda Rajapakse appointed him Secretary-General of the Sri Lankan Government Secretariat for Coordinating the Peace Process and in June 2008 he also became concurrently the Secretary to the Ministry of Disaster Management and Human Rights (Sri Lanka).  The Peace Secretariat wound up in July 2009), and in February 2010 he resigned from the Ministry as well as the University, and became a member of parliament on the National List of the United People's Freedom Alliance following the General Election held in April 2010, following which he was appointed a member of parliament.

He belongs to the Liberal Party of Sri Lanka, and has served as its President and leader, and also as a Vice-President of Liberal International. He is currently Chair of the Council of Asian Liberals and Democrats and was re-elected leader of the Liberal Party Sri Lanka on the proposal of the previous leader following the Liberal Party Annual Congress of 2011. He has travelled widely, including as a Visiting Professor on the Semester at Sea Programme of the University of Pittsburgh, and has published Beyond the First Circle: Travels in the Second and Third Worlds.

Education and career
Rajiva Wijesinha schooled at S Thomas' College, Mt Lavinia (which he later served as Sub-Warden, for a brief period), and won an Open Exhibition in Classics to University College, Oxford when he was 16. After his first degree, which also led to an MA in 1977, he moved to Corpus Christi College, Oxford as an E K Chambers Student (Edmund Kerchever Chambers), and obtained a BPhil degree in English, followed by a DPhil degree on the subject of Women and Marriage in the early Victorian novel. The thesis was subsequently published by the University Press of America under the title The Androgynous Trollope.

He taught briefly at the University of Peradeniya before resigning in protest against the increasing authoritarianism of the government of President Junius Richard Jayewardene.  He then worked for the British Council in Colombo as its Cultural Affairs Officer before rejoining the University system to initiate English degree programmes for students from backgrounds that had limited English in school. He was responsible for the islandwide pre-University General English Language Training programme, as well as General English programmes at the Affiliated University Colleges established in 1992 to introduce employment oriented courses into the tertiary education system.

In 2001 he served as a Consultant to the Ministry of Education to initiate the reintroduction of English medium education in the state sector, which had banned it previously for several decades. He was also Academic Consultant to the Sri Lanka Military Academy when it began degree programmes for Officer Cadets. He has served as chair of the Academic Affairs Committee of the National Institute of Education, and has been a member of the National Education Commission and of the Board of the Bandaranaike Centre for International Studies.

In 1982 he supported Chanaka Amaratunga to set up the Council for Liberal Democracy and was Co-Editor of the Liberal Review, at a time when dissenting voices had no space to publish in Sri Lanka. He became President of the Liberal Party of Sri Lanka when it was established in 1987 and, though more comfortable as an analyst rather than a politician, he took over as Leader of the Party after Dr Amaratunga's death in 1996. He was the Presidential candidate of the party in 1999, and came 6th out of 15 candidates, defeating several former parliamentarians. During this period he conducted workshops on Liberalism in India, Pakistan, Nepal, Afghanistan and Indonesia, on behalf of the Friedrich Naumann Stiftung (FNS), the German Liberal Foundation, for whom he also edited Liberal Values for South Asia (revised recently as Liberal Perspectives on South Asia and published in 2009 by Cambridge University Press, Delhi).

He was instrumental in promoting English Language writing in Sri Lanka, and initiated the English Writers Cooperative of Sri Lanka while he was at the British Council which aided and administered the EWC at its inception. He had earlier edited the New Lankan Review, which provided space for Sri Lankan writers in English when the genre was regaining acceptance, and he served on the Editorial Board of the EWC for over a decade. He has edited several collections of poetry and short stories by Sri Lankan writers in English, most recently Bridging Connections, an Anthology of Stories which also contains translations from Sinhala and Tamil and was published by the National Book Trust of India in 2007.

He was the first Sri Lankan writer resident in the county whose works have been translated into a European language. Servi, the Italian translation of Servants which won the Gratiaen Award for 1995, was published by Giovanni Tranchida Editore in Milan in 2002, and this was followed in 2006 by Atti di fede. This last was a translation of Acts of Faith, based on the 1983 government-sponsored riots against Tamils known as Black July, and the first part of a trilogy that included Days of Despair (1989) and The Limits of Love (2005). He worked on this last novel, which is based on the kidnapping and murder of the poet and journalist Richard de Zoysa, as a resident at the Rockefeller Foundation's Bellagio Center and at the Center for Writers at Hawthornden Castle.

Prof Wijesinha served for several years on the editorial board of the Journal of Commonwealth Literature. Works in other genres include The Foundations of Modern Society, Political Principles and their Practice in Sri Lanka and A Handbook of English Grammar, published by Cambridge University Press in Delhi, which also brought out most recently Declining Sri Lanka: J R Jayewardene and the erosion of Democracy.

Work

Fiction
Acts of Faith, 1985
Electra (A play in three Acts)
Days of Despair, 1989
The Lady Hippopotamus and Other Stories, 1991
Servants: A Cycle, 1995
An English Education, 1996
The Limits of Love, 2005
Servi, 2002 (Italian translation of Servants: A Cycle, 1995)
Atti di fede, 2006 (Italian translation of Acts of Faith, 1985)
The Terrorist Trilogy, 2008.
Acts of Faith, 2016
Servants(2nd Expanded Edition), 2020

Non Fiction
The Androgynous Trollope: Women in the Victorian Novel (1982)

Education
English and Education: in search of equity and excellence?, 2016
A City of Acquatint (Letters from Oxford to Colombo 1971-79), 2018
 George Cawkwell of Univ. Colombo, Sri Lanka: S. Godage & Brothers, 2019 (edited)

English Language
Aspects of Teaching and Learning English as a Second Language, 1991 (edited with James Drury)
A Guide to Studying and Thinking, 1998 (with Priyantha Kulatunge and Ralf Starkloff)
A Handbook of English Grammar, 2004
Building Career Skills, 2016  (with Shashikala Assella, B. M. C. N. Balasooriya, Noel Jayamanne, Darshana Sanjeewa, Ravi Pratap Singh, Neomal Weerakoon)
Developing Career Skills, 2016 (with Thilanka Ariyathilaka, Shashikala Assella, B. M. C. N. Balasooriya, Noel Jayamanne, Darshana Sanjeewa, Ravi Pratap Singh, Neomal Weerakoon)

Literature
Breaking Bounds: Essays on Sri Lankan Writing in English, 1998
Inside Limits: Identity and Repression in Post- Colonial Fiction, 1998
A Selection of Modern Sri Lankan Short Stories in English, edited (with Dinali Fernando), 2005
A Selection of Modern Sri Lankan Poetry in English, 2006
Bridging Connections (An Anthology of Sri Lankan Short Stories), 2007
Poets and their Visions, 2015
An Anthology of English Poetry and Prose, 2016

Travel and Social History
Beyond the First Circle: Travels in the Second and Third Worlds, 1993
Fact and Fable: Aspects of East West Interaction (proceedings of a conference held at Sabaragamuwa University in August 1999), 2000
Richard de Zoysa: his life, some work ... a death, 2000
Across Cultures: Issues of Identity in Contemporary British and Sri Lankan Writing, 2001 (edited with Neluka Silva)
Gilding the Lily: Celebrating Ena de Silva, 2002
All Experience: Essays and Reflections (edited essays of Sam Wijesinha), 2001.
The Foundations of Modern Society, 2004
Endgames and Excursions: Lakmahal, Sri Lanka and a wider world, 2017
Lakmahal Justified: Taking English to The People, 2018
Lakmahal in War for Peace, 2019

Politics
Current Crisis in Sri Lanka, 1986
 Liberal Values for South Asia (edited with Friedrich Naumann Stiftung), Colombo, 1997
Conflict: Causes and Consequences (proceedings of a Seminar Series conducted by the CLD), (edited with Priyantha Kulatunge), 2001
 Political Principles and their Practice in Sri Lanka, 2005
Enemies of Pluralism: Assaults on Diversity, Democracy and the Rule of Law, by JR Jayewardene & Velupillai Prabhakaran, 2006
Ideas for Constitutional Reform, 2007 (revised/abridged from the original publication as edited by Dr Chanaka Amaratunga, 1989)
Declining Sri Lanka, 2007
Pursuing Peace, Fighting Falsehood, 2008
Reform, Rights and Good Governance, 2015
Triumph and Disaster: the Rajapaksa Years.  Part 1 – Success in War, 2015
Triumph and Disaster: the Rajapaksa Years. Part 2 - Failure in Reconciliation, 2016
The Mango Tree: Inclusivity and Integrity in International Relations, 2016

Articles in books & major journals
Interview in Configurations of Exile: South Asian Writers and their World, edited by Chelva Kanaganayakam, TSAR, Toronto, 1995
Teaching Post-Colonial Literature in Sri Lanka' in Dolphin 27 – Teaching Post-Colonialism and Post-Colonial Literatures, edited by Anne Collett, Lars Jensen & Anna Rutherford, Aarhus, 1997
"Aberrations and Excesses: Sri Lanka substantiated by the Funny Boy", Miscelanea vol. 18, Universidad de Zaragoza, 1997
"Cutting through Territories: Naipaul's 'A Way in the World'", Translating Cultures, KRK/Dangaroo, 1999
"Sex and the Single Girl: Scott's recommendations for the Raj", Gladly wolde she teche and lerne: Essays in honour of Yasmine Gooneratne, London 1999
Why are we afraid of Secularism in Pakistan?, Christian Study Centre, Rawalpindi, 1999
"Travesties: Romance and Reality in the Raj Quartet", Journal of Comparative Literature and Aesthetics, Orissa, 2000
"Spices and Sandcastles: the exotic historians of Sri Lanka", Across Cultures: Issues of Identity in Contemporary British and Sri Lankan Writing (proceedings of the Conference held at the British Council Sri Lanka in 2000; British Council, Colombo, 2001)
"A deeper communion: the older women of The Raj Quartet", Missions of Interdependence, the publication of the proceedings of the 1999 Tübingen EACLALS Conference (Rhodopi, 2002)
"Richard de Zoysa: his life, some work ... and a death", Towards a Transcultural Future: Literature and Human Rights in a ‘Post’-Colonial World, the publication of the proceedings of the 2000 ASNEL Conference held in Aachen  (Rhodopi 2005)
"Bringing back the bathwater: new initiatives in English policy in Sri Lanka", The Politics of English as a World Language, the publication of the proceedings of the 2001 ASNEL Conference held in Freiburg (Rhodopi, 2003)
"Religion and Culture in the Liberal State", Liberal Values for South Asia, edited by Wijesinha, CLD, Colombo 1997
"Education in Sri Lanka – the failure of good intentions and little learning", Protection of Minority Rights and Diversity, edited by Nanda Wanasundara, International Centre for Ethnic Studies, 2004
"Agendas of Oppression", I want to speak of tenderness: 50 writers for Anne Ranasinghe, edited by Gerard Robuchon, ICES 2004
"Travels in the United States", Excursions and Explorations: Cultural Encounters between Sri Lanka and the United States, edited by Tissa Jayatilaka, Colombo, 2002
"A Refuge", Gilding the Lily: Celebrating Ena de Silva, edited by Wijesinha, Colombo, 2002
"Entries on Bapsi Sidhwa and Sri Lankan Literature", Encyclopaedia of Postcolonial Studies, edited by John C Hawley, USA, 2001
Entry on Sri Lankan Literature in English in the Encyclopaedia of South Asian Literature in English, edited by Jaina Sanga, USA, 2004

See also
List of Sri Lankan non-career Permanent Secretaries

References

External links
Official Blog
The Reconciliation Website (former Official Website of SCOPP)

Reconciliation Unit blog
Liberal Party of Sri Lanka official site

Literary Blog
Full text of doctoral thesis "Marriage and the position of women, as presented by some of the early Victorian novelists" via Oxford Research Archive

1954 births
Alumni of Corpus Christi College, Oxford
Alumni of University College, Oxford
Candidates in the 2019 Sri Lankan presidential election
Candidates in the 1999 Sri Lankan presidential election
English-language writers from Sri Lanka
Living people
Members of the 14th Parliament of Sri Lanka
People associated with S. Thomas' College, Mount Lavinia
Sinhalese writers
Sri Lankan novelists
State ministers of Sri Lanka